Papa Massé Mbaye Fall is a Senegalese-born Bissau-Guinean football player and coach. His playing position is a goalkeeper and he is the goalkeeper coach of A.D. Polideportivo Aguadulce.

International career
He made his international debut for Guinea-Bissau against Zambia on 4 June 2016. His eligibility for Guinea-Bissau has been questioned by the Football Association of Zambia, that sent a complaint to the Confederation of African Football.
His eligibility was upheld on 22 August 2016, confirming Guinea-Bissau's cup of Nations qualification.

Personal life
He is the younger brother of FIFA referee Ousmane Fall.

References 

1985 births
Living people
Footballers from Dakar
Citizens of Guinea-Bissau through descent
Bissau-Guinean footballers
Guinea-Bissau international footballers
Senegalese footballers
Senegalese people of Bissau-Guinean descent
Association football goalkeepers
Divisiones Regionales de Fútbol players
Senegalese expatriate footballers
Senegalese expatriate sportspeople in Spain
Expatriate footballers in Spain
Senegalese expatriate sportspeople in Germany
Expatriate footballers in Germany
2017 Africa Cup of Nations players